Day Into Night is the second full-length album by the Canadian melodic death metal band Quo Vadis. It was released on March 30, 2000. The album was accompanied by a music video for the song "Dysgenics".

Critical reception

Greg Platt for Brave Words & Bloody Knuckles spoke highly of the album, comparing the album's sound to that of Kataklysm and Carcass. He also praised the production, with the "double-bass drums pounding heavy and proud and vocalist Yanic growling, whispering, speaking and screaming nicely over the whole thing." Metal Storm also spoke highly of the album and called Quo Vadis "one of the best bands to come from North America in the last years, and an underrated act also." Metal.de cited the album as being "played at a high technical level and implemented with a transparent production" but criticized the vocals, stating they "lag behind the rest of the instrumentation in terms of quality."

Track listing

Personnel

Quo Vadis
Arie Itman – vocals, guitar, solo on tracks 2, 3, 4, 5, 6, 9
Bart Frydrychowicz – guitars, solo on tracks 7 and 10
Remy Beauchamp – bass
Yanic Bercier – drums, backing vocals

Guest musicians
Claude Picard - keyboards

References

Quo Vadis (band) albums
2000 albums